Angelo Compagnoni (25 September 1921 – 25 June 2018) was an Italian politician who served as a Deputy from 1953 to 1963 and Senator from 1963 to 1972.

References

1921 births
2018 deaths
20th-century Italian politicians
Italian trade unionists
Mayors of places in Lazio
Deputies of Legislature II of Italy
Deputies of Legislature III of Italy
Senators of Legislature IV of Italy
Senators of Legislature V of Italy
Italian Communist Party politicians
People from the Province of Frosinone